The Buffalo International Film Festival was founded in 2006, and takes place in October of each year in Buffalo, New York. It is also known as the Buffalo Film Festival.

History
The film festival became a 501c3 not-for-profit charity in January 2005.

In 2007 it was responsible for the discovery of the Vitascope Theater, part of Edisonia Hall, the first purpose-built movie theater in the world which opened in 1896. The festival now sponsors a yearly event celebrating the creation of the Movie Theater in Buffalo.

It also made Buffalo the first city in the world to declare UNESCO World Day for Audio-Visual Heritage.

In 2013 the BIFF hosted a meet and greet book signing with children's author Keith White Jr. for the screenings of Magic Camp and Dear Mr. Watterson. White was again present at the 2014 BIFF.

Board
The board of Advisors includes: Tom Fontana, Lauren Belfer, Lawrence Block, A.R. Gurney, Nancy Kress, Herbert Hauptman, Jim Steranko, Howard Bloom, Edward Summer, Lloyd Kaufman, David Shire, Mort Walker, Bill Prady and others.

Not-for-profit activities
Its other activities include: The Buffalo Film Society (founded 2008) along with the Niagara Falls Film Society, Buffalo-Niagara Film Society; the New York State Movie Theater Corridor (founded 2006); The Buffalo Walk of Fame (founded 2006); The Buffalo Movie Hall of Fame (founded 2006); The Buffalo; and the Buffalo Cinematheque.

Awards  and screenings

2007
The inaugural festival was June 13, 2007 and included "Student Films Across America."

2008
In 2008, it screened more than 25 films including regional and national premieres. These screenings included a Harold Lloyd Film Retrospective (with personal appearance by Suzanne Lloyd and "Hollywood 39" a retrospective of great Hollywood movies from 1939.

2009
It holds a Spring Gala and Fall Festival. In 2009, the Spring Gala was a celebration of Walt Disney and Mickey Mouse arranged through The Walt Disney Company.

The third annual festival, Buffalo Film Festival 2009, ran from October 9–27, 2009 and included 18 films from all over the world and 16 guests who presented them including Abigail Disney, Rick Schmidlin, Charles Band, Dwayne Buckle, David Heeley, Ray Bradbury, J.B. Kaufman, Mary Pat Kelly  It included the First Annual Al Boasberg Comedy Award given in honor of famed comedy writer Al Boasberg who was born in Buffalo.

World Premiere: Kate and Fred: Hepburn and Astaire directed by David Heeley and Joan Kramer
Western New York Premiere: The Minority directed by Dwayne Buckle
Western New York Premiere: Pray the Devil Back to Hell co-directed by Abigail Disney
Al Boasberg Comedy Award—Lifetime Achievement in Comedy Writing - Larry Gelbart
Al Boasberg Comedy Award—Lifetime Achievement in Comedy Writing - Joseph Stein
Al Boasberg Comedy Award—Lifetime Achievement in Comedy Writing - Everett Greenbaum
Al Boasberg Comedy Award—Lifetime Achievement in Comedy Performance - Kathleen Howard
Al Boasberg Comedy Award—Lifetime Achievement in Comedy Art and Writing - Harvey Kurtzman

2010
The fourth Annual Buffalo International Film Festival ran from October 1–10, 2010. 60 films were screened.
World Premiere: God's Land directed by Preston Miller
New York State Premiere: Louis Sullivan: The Struggle for American Architecture directed by Mark Richard Smith
New York State Premiere: Hard Four directed by Charles Dennis
New York State Premiere: Superstonic Sound directed by Raphael Erichsen
Western New York Premiere: La Soga directed by Josh Crook
Western New York Premiere: Metropolis directed by Fritz Lang (World Day for AudioVisual Heritage Screening)
Western New York Premiere: Waking Sleeping Beauty directed by Don Hahn
Special Screening: Temple Grandin directed by Mick Jackson (exclusive theatrical, benefit screening)
Al Boasberg Comedy Award—Lifetime Achievement in Comedy Performance Sid Caesar

2011
Approximately 80 films were screened. Audience Awards were given for the first time.

World Premiere: Kumpanía: Flamenco Los Angeles directed by Katina Dunn

Audience Award

 Winner: Kumpanía: Flamenco Los Angeles

2012
In 2012, 70 films were screened at three locations including The Screening Room, Amherst, NY; Historic Lockport Palace Theatre, Lockport, NY; Market Arcade Film and Arts Center, Buffalo, NY.

Audience Awards given.
	
Best of Festival
TIE – Ray Harryhausen: Special Effects Titan (UK, France) Gilles Penso, Ray and Diana Harryhausen Foundation
TIE – Starry, Starry Night (Taiwan) Tom Lin Shu-yu, ChinaLion

Best Drama

First Place: Starry, Starry Night  (Taiwan) Tom Lin Shu-yu, ChinaLion
Second Place: Extraterrestrial (Extraterrestre) (Spain) NachoVigalondo, Arsenico Producciones/Tugg
Third Place: A Case of Deceit (Canada)
	
Best Documentary
First Place: Ray Harryhausen: Special FX Titan (UK, France) Gilles Penso, Ray and Diana Harryhausen Foundation
Second Place: Somewhere Between (USA) Linda Goldstein Knowlton, Longshot Factory
Third Place: Alive Inside (work-in-progress) (USA) Michael Rossato-Bennett, Ximotion Media
	
Animation
First Place: My Neighbor Totoro (Japan) Hayao Miyazaki, Studio Ghibli

Foreign Language Film
First Place: Starry, Starry Night (Taiwan) Tom Lin Shu-yu, ChinaLion
Second Place: Extraterrestrial (Extraterrestre) (Spain)  Nacho, Vigalondo, Arsenico Producciones/Tugg
	
Best Science Fiction
First Place: Extraterrestrial (Extraterrestre)  (Spain)  Nacho Vigalondo, Arsenico Producciones/Tugg

Best Short Film – International
First Place:  Behind the Concrete (Niagara Falls, Ontario, Canada)

"2012 Best of Buffalo" 
(all films in this category are made by filmmakers from Buffalo and Western New York)

Feature Film
First Place: Zeus

Short Film
First Place: Take It Off – Anna Van Valin
Second Place: Viral Video
Honorable Mention:  Feeble Attraction; Exit 7A

2015
Best Narrative Feature
Gold Bison: Oblivion Season (Iran) directed by Abbas Rafei
Special Jury Prize: Abby Singer/Songwriter (USA) directed by Onur Tukel

Best WNY Feature
Gold Bison: Emelie (USA) directed by Michael Thelin
Special Jury Prize: Prescient (Singapore, USA) directed by Hann-Shi Lem

Best Feature Documentary
Gold Bison: A Courtship (USA) directed by Amy Kohn
Special Jury Prize: Aspie Seeks Love

Audience Award
Gold Bison: ...In The Dark (USA) directed by David Spaltro

Best Short Film
Gold Bison: I Scream Your Name
Special Jury Prize: Royal Women's Association

Best WNY Short
Gold Bison: Long John
Special Jury Prize: Aleatories From an Echo

Best WNY Student Film
Gold Bison: Mer Depre
Special Jury Prize: Locomotion

Supersnipe Award
Gold Bison: Detectives of Noir Town

2022
Best Narrative Feature
Relative directed by Michael Glover Smith

Best WNY Feature
Bunker directed by Adrian Langley

Best Feature Documentary
Terrible Children directed Shanti Thakur

BIFF Boundary Breaker Award
A Rising Fury directed by Lesya Kalynska and Ruslan Batytskyi
Bashira directed by Nickson Fong

Special Jury Prize
The Rules of LaCrosse directed by Joanne Storkan

Best Episodic Project
Mashed directed by Stacey Maltin

Best Animated Film
Lock the Gate directed by Sarah Lynn Galasso

Best Short Film
Colony Collapse Disorder directed by Amos Hozman

Best WNY Short
I'll Find a Way or Make One directed by Rebecca Fasanello and Teresa Castillo

Best Documentary Short
Winter 1984 directed by Tony Buba

Best WNY Student Film
Falling Up directed by Davis Cameron Chu

Tilke Hill Work-in-Progress Award
Diane Jones

References

External links 
The Buffalo International Film Festival

Festivals in Buffalo, New York
Film festivals in New York (state)
Film festivals established in 2003